Rauti may refer to

Places
 Răuți, a village in Uivar Commune, Timiș County, Romania

Persons
 Isabella Rauti (born 1962), Italian academic and politician
 Nicola Rauti (born 2000), Italian professional footballer
 Pino Rauti (1926–2012), Italian politician of the far-right

See also
 Ruti (disambiguation)